Cipatujah is a coastal district in Tasikmalaya Regency, West Java, Indonesia. The district had a population of 62,858 at the 2010 Census.

References

tasikmalaya Regency
Districts of West Java